Suzy Soft was a Yugoslav video game publisher active during the 1980s, operating in Croatia. It started in 1985 as the software division of Suzy Records, based in Zagreb, and published video games and programs for ZX Spectrum, Commodore 64 and Orao by various Yugoslav developers. It was the first Yugoslav company dedicated to software publishing. The house became defunct in 1988, as its parent ditched the software publishing department.

Software

Ali Baba (1985), by Mario Mandic
Atomski ratnik
Bajke (1986), together with Xenon
Dobro jutro programiranje (1985), by Damir Muraja
The Drinker (1985), by Saša Pušica
Flower Man (1988)
Game Mix (1987)
Grand Prix ITD BBB
Jamski Heroj (1987)
Joe Bankar (1986)
Ključ (1988), by Saša Požgaj
Loto 7 od 39 / Loto analiza
Nevidljivi (Orao, 1988), by Damir Muraja
Slagalica
Teatar (illustrated text adventure game, 1986)
Television
Velika nevolja
Vjetrenjača
Vesoljska zgodba (1985)
Vruće ljetovanje (1985)
Zodiak Strip, (1985)
Western Girl (1988)

References

External links
GameFAQs.com : Suzy Soft

Video game publishers
Companies based in Zagreb
Defunct software companies of Iceland
Defunct video game companies
Video game companies of Croatia